Archibald Peter "Archie" McNab (May 29, 1864 – April 29, 1945) was the sixth Lieutenant Governor of Saskatchewan from 1936 until 1945. He was the last lieutenant-governor of the province to live in Government House.

He was born in Glengarry County, Ontario, the son of Malcolm McNab and Margaret McCrimmon, and moved to Winnipeg in 1882 with his twin brother before establishing a homestead in Virden, Manitoba.

Years of drought forced him to give up farming and in 1887 he became a grain buyer for Ogilvie Flour Mills. In 1892, McNab married Edith Wilson Todd.

In 1902, the company transferred him to Rosthern, Saskatchewan where he invested in two grain elevators. After selling them, he moved to Saskatoon with his wife and children and established the Dominion Elevator Company. He also helped found the Saskatchewan Central Railway Company and the Saskatchewan Power Company.

He entered politics and was elected to the Saskatchewan legislature in the 1908 general election as a Liberal MLA representing Saskatoon City. In government, he was appointed commissioner of municipal affairs and became Minister of Public Works in 1912. One of his accomplishments was helping acquire the University of Saskatchewan for Saskatoon. In 1922, he was also named Minister of Telephones.

McNab retired from the legislature when he was appointed to the local government board in 1926 but was forced to resign in 1930 due to allegations of impropriety.

In 1936, he was appointed lieutenant-governor. As provincial viceroy he hosted King George VI and Queen Elizabeth at Government House during their 1939 royal visit to Canada.

The Saskatchewan Co-operative Commonwealth Federation was elected to government in the 1944 general election and closed Government-House in September 1944 as an austerity measure making McNab its last occupant. He was moved to the Hotel Saskatchewan, where his successors as Lieutenant-Governor also had their offices and lived.

In ill health, he resigned as lieutenant-governor on February 26, 1945. He died of pneumonia two months later.

His uncle Archibald McNab was a member of the Canadian House of Commons.

References

1864 births
1945 deaths
Lieutenant Governors of Saskatchewan
Members of the Executive Council of Saskatchewan
Saskatchewan Liberal Party MLAs
People from the United Counties of Stormont, Dundas and Glengarry
People from Virden, Manitoba